Hypsopygia acerasta is a moth of the  family Pyralidae. It was described by Alfred Jefferis Turner in 1904 and is found in Australia.

References

Moths of Australia
Moths described in 1904
Pyralini